Moškovec is a village and municipality in Turčianske Teplice District in the Žilina Region of northern central Slovakia.

History
In historical records the village was first mentioned in 1258.

Geography
The municipality lies at an altitude of 450 metres and covers an area of 2.101 km². It has a population of about 63 people.

External links
 
 
http://www.statistics.sk/mosmis/eng/run.html

Villages and municipalities in Turčianske Teplice District